Brenthia monolychna is a species of moth of the family Choreutidae. It is found in Costa Rica.

Adults mimic jumping spiders, one of their predators. In a recently conducted experiment, Brenthia hexaselena and Brenthia monolychna had higher survival rates than other similarly sized moths in the presence of jumping spiders and jumping spiders responded to Brenthia with territorial displays, indicating that the species were sometimes mistaken for jumping spiders, and not recognized as prey.

The larvae feed mostly on the underside of leaves, occasionally on the upper sides, skeletonizing the leaf superficially. They are pale green. When disturbed, larvae move rapidly through an escape hole they made in the leaf. Cocoons are usually spun on the underside of the leaf.

References

Moths described in 1915
Brenthia
Articles containing video clips